Dr Szabolcs Czira (born 28 September 1951) is a Hungarian politician, member of the National Assembly (MP) for Nagykőrös (Pest County Constituency XVI) from 1998 to 2014. He was a member of the Committee on Employment and Labour. Czira is the current Mayor of Nagykőrös since 2002.

Czira joined the Hungarian Socialist Workers' Party (MSZMP) in late 1987. He was a member of the Independent Smallholders, Agrarian Workers and Civic Party (FKGP) from 1993 until 2002. He served as deputy leader of its parliamentary group between 2001 and 2002. He joined Fidesz in 2002.

Personal life
He is married to Dr Tímea Cziráné Kőházi Kis. They have a daughter, Tímea and a son, Szabolcs.

References

1951 births
Living people
Members of the Hungarian Socialist Workers' Party
Independent Smallholders, Agrarian Workers and Civic Party politicians
Fidesz politicians
Members of the National Assembly of Hungary (1998–2002)
Members of the National Assembly of Hungary (2002–2006)
Members of the National Assembly of Hungary (2006–2010)
Members of the National Assembly of Hungary (2010–2014)
Mayors of places in Hungary
People from Nagykőrös